Didine Djouhary (born 8 February 1999) is a French professional footballer.

References

External links 
 
 
 

1999 births
Living people
French footballers
French expatriate footballers
Association football midfielders
FC Nantes players
Novara F.C. players
U.S. Folgore Caratese A.S.D. players
Stade Poitevin FC players
Lyon La Duchère players
FK Spartaks Jūrmala players
FC Shakhtyor Soligorsk players
FC Gorodeya players
FC Sputnik Rechitsa players
French expatriate sportspeople in Italy
French expatriate sportspeople in Latvia
Expatriate footballers in Italy
Expatriate footballers in Latvia
Expatriate footballers in Belarus